Chandraprabha Urs (1946–2016) was a politician from Karnataka. She was a member of the 10th Lok Sabha and Karnataka Legislative Assembly. She was with Janata Party and Congress at various times.

Early life
Chandraprabha was born on 25 May 1946 in Hunsur, Mysore district. Her father D. Devaraj Urs was a member of the Indian National Congress (INC) and went on to become the Chief Minister of Karnataka. She graduated from the Smt. VHD Central Institute of Home Science with a degree in library science.

Career
As a member of the Janata Party, Urs won the 1983 Karnataka Legislative Assembly election from Hunsur and was appointed the Minister for Social Welfare, Sericulture and excise in Ramakrishna Hegde's cabinet. Later she joined the INC and served her second term in the state assembly from 1989 to 1991. In the 1991 Indian general election, INC made her its official candidate from Mysore against Bharatiya Janata Party's Srikantadatta Narasimharaja Wadiyar, the titular Maharaja of Mysore. She polled 2,25, 881 votes against his 2,08,999; defeating him by a margin of 16,882 votes.

Personal life
She married M.C. Mohan Raj Urs. Urs died on 3 May 2016 at a Mysore hospital after suffering a cardiac arrest.

References

1946 births
2016 deaths
Women members of the Lok Sabha
Lok Sabha members from Karnataka
India MPs 1991–1996
Indian National Congress politicians from Karnataka
Karnataka MLAs 1983–1985
Karnataka MLAs 1989–1994
Janata Party politicians
Indian National Congress (U) politicians
Women members of the Karnataka Legislative Assembly